Fábio Alexandre Duarte Felício (born 2 May 1982) is a Portuguese former footballer who played as a midfielder.

Club career
Born in Faro, Algarve, Felício made his professional debut with hometown club S.C. Farense, appearing in the Primeira Liga not yet aged 18. He continued to develop at neighbours S.C. Olhanense, in the lower leagues.

After a single season with Académica de Coimbra, again in the top division, Felício established himself at fellow league side U.D. Leiria, helping them qualify twice for the UEFA Intertoto Cup. His solid displays attracted the attention of Spain's Real Sociedad, but he did not settle at all at his new team, and left in the following transfer window.

Before the start of the 2007 season, Felício signed with Russian Premier League club FC Rubin Kazan. He made his debut on 4 March, appearing as a starter in a 1–3 defeat against FC Rostov in the Russian Cup, but lost his place in the first team very soon, playing just two league games since the fifth round and eventually went on to serve two consecutive loans, one of them back in his country with C.S. Marítimo; in an interview, Rubin manager Kurban Berdyyev described him as "a heaven-born footballer, but a coward, not a fighter", criticizing him for his inability to demonstrate his talent during games.

Felício spent the 2008–09 season in Greece playing for Asteras Tripoli FC, on loan. In mid-December 2009 he agreed on a return to Portugal, signing with Vitória de Guimarães.

References

External links

1982 births
Living people
Portuguese footballers
Association football midfielders
Primeira Liga players
Liga Portugal 2 players
Segunda Divisão players
S.C. Farense players
S.C. Olhanense players
Associação Académica de Coimbra – O.A.F. players
U.D. Leiria players
C.S. Marítimo players
Vitória S.C. players
Rio Ave F.C. players
Portimonense S.C. players
Louletano D.C. players
S.R. Almancilense players
La Liga players
Real Sociedad footballers
Russian Premier League players
FC Rubin Kazan players
Super League Greece players
Asteras Tripolis F.C. players
Portugal youth international footballers
Portuguese expatriate footballers
Expatriate footballers in Spain
Expatriate footballers in Russia
Expatriate footballers in Greece
Portuguese expatriate sportspeople in Spain
Portuguese expatriate sportspeople in Russia
Portuguese expatriate sportspeople in Greece
People from Faro, Portugal
Sportspeople from Faro District